Maximilian Mehring (born 15 April 1986) is a German former professional footballer who played as a midfielder.

Career
Mehring was born in Worms. He began his career with FSV 03 Osthofen before joining SV Horchheim in the summer of 1997. After a successful spell with SV Horchheim he moved to Ludwigshafener SC in 2000 and then SC Freiburg in 2002. In 2005, he was promoted to the club's reserve team and on 18 June 2007 he signed his first professional contract. He made his first-team debut in September 2008 as a substitute in a 3–1 win against FC Augsburg. In May 2009 he left SC Freiburg after eight years at the club.

References

External links
Maximilian Mehring at kicker.de 
 

1986 births
Living people
People from Worms, Germany
Association football midfielders
German footballers
FC Carl Zeiss Jena players
SC Freiburg players
SV Darmstadt 98 players
Eintracht Frankfurt II players
2. Bundesliga players
Footballers from Rhineland-Palatinate